The 1938 National Division was the 2nd edition of the Turkish National Division. Güneş SK won their first title.

Overview
Fenerbahçe got into a conflict with the Turkish Football Federation, as they initially wanted to play the home games in their own homeground, but the federation declined the request. Fenerbahçe claimed that their travel expenses were not paid appropriately by the TFF and withdrew after the 4th match.

Participants

Güneş SK - Istanbul Football League, 1st
Fenerbahçe - Istanbul Football League, 2nd
Beşiktaş - Istanbul Football League, 3rd
Galatasaray - Istanbul Football League, 4th
Harp Okulu - Ankara Football League, 1st
Muhafızgücü - Ankara Football League, 2nd
Üçok - İzmir Football League, 1st
Alsancak - İzmir Football League

League standings

Results

References
 Erdoğan Arıpınar; Tevfik Ünsi Artun, Cem Atabeyoğlu, Nurhan Aydın, Ergun Hiçyılmaz, Haluk San, Orhan Vedat Sevinçli, Vala Somalı (June 1992). Türk Futbol Tarihi (1904-1991) vol.1, Page(80), Türkiye Futbol Federasyonu Yayınları.

Turkish National Division Championship seasons
1937–38 in Turkish football
Turkey